Mahesh Singh Jeena is an Indian politician. He was elected to the Uttarakhand Legislative Assembly from Salt Assembly constituency in the 2021 Uttarakhand Legislative assembly By-elections as a member of the Bharatiya Janata Party. He defeated Ganga Pancholi of Indian National Congress by 4,600  votes in  2021 By-elections.. Elections happened due to Mahesh Singh Jeena's elder brother Surendra Singh Jeena, who was undergoing treatment for COVID-19 at a hospital in New Delhi, who died early on 12 November 2020.

References 

Living people
Year of birth missing (living people)
21st-century Indian politicians
People from Almora district
Bharatiya Janata Party politicians from Uttarakhand
Uttarakhand MLAs 2017–2022
Uttarakhand MLAs 2022–2027